The prominent women's sports leagues in the United States and Canada serve as the pinnacle of women's athletic competition in North America. The United States is home to the vast majority of professional women's leagues. In North America, the top women's leagues feature both team sports and individual athletes. While some leagues have paid professional women athletes, others do not and function at a semi-professional level. 

The team sports of soccer (also known as association football), basketball, fastpitch softball, ice hockey, ringette, women's gridiron football (full contact), flat track roller derby, and lacrosse are among the top leagues for women in North America. Professional individual sports involving women are also well-liked in North America, with women's tennis in the United States proving to be particularly successful. Other popular female-only sports in the region include tennis, bowling and golf.

Record attendances recorded by women's professional sports leagues have been dominated by the National Women's Soccer League (NWSL), Women's National Basketball Association (WNBA), and at one time, the now defunct Women's Professional Soccer (WPS) league.

Professional vs semi-professional
The main difference between women's semi-professional sports and women's professional sports is the amount of compensation that athletes receive. In professional sports, athletes are paid a full-time salary to play their sport, and it is their primary source of income. These athletes may receive very high salaries, especially in the most popular and profitable sports such as basketball, or soccer.

On the other hand, in semi-professional sports, athletes are not paid a full-time salary, but instead may receive a smaller stipend or payment, or may be compensated in other ways such as free equipment, travel expenses, or other perks. Semi-professional athletes often hold other jobs or have academic commitments, and sports may be a hobby or a secondary source of income.

Another difference between the two is the level of competition. Professional sports typically involve the best athletes in the world competing at the highest level, with high stakes and intense competition. In semi-professional sports, the level of competition can vary, with some events or leagues including high-level athletes, while others may be more focused on local or regional competition.

Overall, the main difference between semi-professional and professional sports is the amount of compensation provided to the athletes and the level of competition involved.

Player salaries  

Despite often claiming professional status, only a few women's leagues pay their players, such as the Premier Hockey Federation (PHF), National Women's Soccer League (NWSL), and Women's National Basketball Association (WNBA). Many of the professional leagues pay less than a livable wage, while also offering other incentives in order to claim professional status.

With the approval of the most recent Women's National Basketball Association collective bargaining agreement in 2020, the minimum salary in the 2020 season was $57,000 for players with less than 3 seasons of league experience and $68,000 for all other players. The maximum salary for most players in that season was $185,000, with players meeting specified criteria for league service having a higher maximum of $215,000.

The annual average salary in Women's Professional Soccer (WPS) was $32,000 in 2009. Players salaries can vary (i.e. Marta would have received a salary of $400,000 during the last three seasons 2009–2011).

The Premier Hockey Federation (PHF) was established in 2015 in order to be the first professional women's ice hockey league to pay players a salary. In 2015, the salaries started at a minimum of $10,000 per season, however, the salaries were reduced up to 50% in 2016. The Canadian Women's Hockey League (CWHL) began as a professional league in name only, giving other benefits to its players, but started paying stipends in 2017 with a minimum of $2,000 and up to $10,000 per season financed by the league's addition of teams in China. However, the CWHL ceased operations in 2019 citing the professional status to be financially infeasible.

Player development  
Generally, all major sports leagues possess an amateur system for the development of young players development. Certain women's leagues develop links privileged with minor league amateurs of lower and junior levels. With the growth of women's sports at the NCAA and Canada's U Sports levels in the last decades, athletes are more likely to choose a university education (along with competing at the university level), and then proceed to compete in a top-level major league.

Television broadcasting  
, the Women's National Basketball Association, National Women's Soccer League, National Pro Fastpitch, Premier Hockey Federation, and Women's Flat Track Derby Association have television broadcasting contracts. The Canadian Women's Hockey League had a TV contract before it folded after the 2018–19 season.

Professional women's leagues

There are several professional women's sports leagues in North America where women athletes are paid to play a sport, though most exist in the United States.
Women's professional sports leagues in North America include the following.

Professional team sports

Professional individual sports

(*) = variable: can include singles or doubles

Semi-professional women's leagues

Semi-professional team sports

Women's sports

Women's gridiron football
In North America, women's gridiron football is more commonly known by different names including: "women's tackle football", "women's American football", "women's Canadian football", or simply as "women's football". The term "football" in North American sport should not be confused with the European use of the word which refers a different sport known by North Americans as soccer.

Women's National Football Conference (WNFC)

The Women's National Football Conference (WNFC) is an amateur full-contact Women's American football league in the United States and was founded in 2018. Their inaugural season was in 2019. On their website, the WNFC described themselves as looking to create a standard of excellence and opportunities.  The (WNFC) does not charge teams of players a fee for entry into the league; rather, teams are invited into the league based on quality of market, teams, players and ownership.

On December 10, 2018, the WNFC announced a partnership with Adidas, as part of the latter's "She Breaks Barriers" initiative.  As part of that partnership, Adidas serves as the WNFC's presenting sponsor, with all WNFC teams wearing custom-made Adidas uniforms.

The WNFC played Week 1 of its 2022 season on April 2. All games were streamed on the Vyre Network. The season ended with the Texas Elite Spartans defeating the Utah Falconz 48-12. The WNFC website reports that their broadcast viewership across all Vyre Network platforms has skyrocketed by 475% from 2021, throughout the course of the 2022 season.

Women's basketball

Early history
Professional women's basketball has been played in the United States since 1978. The first professional league was the Women's Pro Basketball League. The league played three seasons from the fall of 1978 to the spring of 1981.

The second women's professional league to be created in the United States was the Women's Basketball Association. The league played three seasons (from 1993 to 1995) with plans to play as a 12-team league in 1997 but disbanded  before 1997 season. In 1996, two professional women's leagues were started in the United States: American Basketball League and  WNBA. The American Basketball League was founded in 1996 during an increase in the interest in the sport following the 1996 Summer Olympics.  The league played two full seasons (1996–97 and 1997–98) and started a third (1998–99) before it folded in December 1998.

Women's National Basketball Association (WNBA)

The Women's National Basketball Association (WNBA) is the top competition in women's basketball. The WNBA was formed in 1996 as the women's counterpart to the National Basketball Association, and league play began in 1997.

The WNBA regular season runs  June to September (Northern Hemisphere spring and summer), which is directly opposite to the traditional basketball season throughout the world. Most WNBA teams play at the same venue as their NBA counterparts and most team names are also very similar to those of NBA teams in the same market, such as the Washington Wizards and Washington Mystics, the Minnesota Timberwolves and Minnesota Lynx.

Attendance
The league's attendance has fluctuated over the last several seasons. It had an average per-game attendance of 8,039 in 2009 and 7,834 in 2010. Total attendance was 1,598,160 in 2010. In 2007, the league signed a television deal with ESPN that would run from 2009 to 2016. This deal is the first to ever pay rights fees to women's teams. In 2009 it had a total television viewership of 413,000 in combined cable and broadcast television.

The 2000 WNBA All-Star Game in Phoenix on July 17, 2000 attracted a crowd of 17,717 supporters. The West All-Stars defeated the East All-Stars with a score of 73–61.

In 2009, 23 million American professional basketball fans, 92.3% of those fans were the audience of the National Basketball Association (NBA) and the remaining 7.7% attended WNBA games.  Mark J. Perry found from the Center for Feminist Research of University of Southern California's "Gender in Televised Sports" found that in 2009 the media coverage for the NBA was 77.8% and WNBA was 22.2%.

Game 1 of the 2011 WNBA Finals on  October 2, 2011, took place at the Target Center in Minneapolis and attracted 15,258 supporters when the Minnesota Lynx scored an 88-74 victory over the Atlanta Dream. Game 2 of the 2011 WNBA Finals on October 5, 2011, attracted 15,124 supporters.

The 2017 WNBA All-Star Game on July 22, 2017, at KeyArena in Seattle had a crowd of 15,221 fans. The West All-Stars defeated the East All-Stars 130–121.

Women's ice hockey

Premier Hockey Federation

In 2015, the Premier Hockey Federation (PHF) was established as the "National Women's Hockey League (NWHL)" with the purpose of being the first professional women's ice hockey league in North America that paid its players.

The league launched its inaugural season in 2015–16 with four teams in the Northeastern United States: the Boston Pride, Buffalo Beauts, Connecticut Whale, and New York Riveters, with all franchises owned by the league. The league initially had a $10,000 minimum salary per season for the players, however, the player's salaries were reduced up to 50% part-way through the league's second season.

In October 2017, the NWHL teams began partnering with established National Hockey League (NHL) teams with an branding agreement between the New York Riveters and the New Jersey Devils. In December 2017, the Buffalo Beauts' franchise was purchased by the NHL's Buffalo Sabres ownership, Pegula Sports and Entertainment, and became the first NWHL franchise to not be owned by the league. The NWHL expanded for the first time in 2018 when the Minnesota Whitecaps, a former member of the Western Women's Hockey League (WWHL) that had been operating independently since 2011, joined the league. More recently, the league added the Toronto Six prior to its 2020–21 season, and renamed itself as the Premier Hockey Federation after that season. A second Canadian team, the Montreal Force, started play in 2022–23.

Women's soccer

Women's soccer is well developed in the United States but has been developed to a lesser extent in Canada. The United States women's national soccer team was established in 1985, while the Canada women's national soccer team was established in 1986. In the United States, the first continental women's league was formed in 1995, then a professional league in 2001.

In 1980 the number of women players in 1980 was recorded to be roughly about 900,000. In 1985 that number had grown to 1.5 million then reached 2 million in 1990. Those numbers peaked at 3 million in 1995 only to fall again by 2000 when registrations fell to 2.7 million.

The success of the women's American national team has not translated into consistent success for women's professional soccer in the United States. The current top professional league, the National Women's Soccer League, is the country's third (and longest-lasting) attempt to establish such a competition.

USL W League

The USL W League began operating in 2022 and should not be confused with the now defunct USL W-League which was a developmental organization which operated from 1995–2015.

National Women's Soccer League 

The National Women's Soccer League (NWSL) is the top level professional women's soccer league in the United States. It began play in spring 2013 with eight teams; four of them were former members of Women's Professional Soccer (WPS), which had been the top women's league in the United States soccer pyramid before its folding in 2012.

Fox Sports had a deal to broadcast nine games in 2013, six in the regular season and the three from the playoffs. ESPN2 and ESPN3 had a similar deal for the 2014 season. Prior to the 2017 season, the NWSL and A&E Networks signed a three-year deal which calls for A&E's Lifetime network to broadcast a weekly Saturday afternoon game; the deal also saw A&E take an ownership stake in the league.

The league expanded to 10 teams in 2016 and 2017 before dropping to 9 for the 2018 season; it returned to 10 teams for 2021, expanded further to 12 in 2022, and will expand to at least 13 teams in 2024. It became the first women's professional league to play a fourth season in 2016.

Attendance
The overall record attendance for the National Women's Soccer League (NWSL) is 32,000, set on September 17, 2022 at San Diego Wave FC's opening match in the new Snapdragon Stadium against regional rival Angel City FC.

Portland Thorns FC averaged more than 13,000 attendance at Providence Park in each of the NWSL's first seven seasons, with an all-time high of 20,098 in the 2019 season.

Women's Premier Soccer League

The Women's Premier Soccer League (WPSL) is a national women's soccer league in the United States and Puerto Rico, and is on the 2nd level of women's soccer in the United States soccer pyramid, alongside United Women's Soccer. The WPSL started as the Western Division of the W-League, before breaking away to form its own league in 1997. The league is sanctioned by the United States Adult Soccer Association as an affiliate of the United States Soccer Federation (USSF).

There are both "professional"/senior teams and amateur teams in the WPSL. An organization has to choose to be one or the other due to NCAA regulations, since collegiate players cannot play on "pro" teams.

United Women's Soccer

United Women's Soccer, variously abbreviated as UWS and UWoSo, shares second-level status with the Women's Premier Soccer League (WPSL). It is a pro-am (professional–amateur) women's soccer league in the United States which combines both professional career athletes and amateurs in competition. The league was formed in 2015 as a response to turmoil within the WPSL and the folding of the USL W-League. The first season in 2016 saw 11 teams participate, all in the U.S.; two Canadian teams initially planned to play that season but were not approved by the country's national federation. Three of the original 11 teams did not return for the league's second season, but UWS still nearly doubled in size for that season, with one Canadian team and 12 American teams entering the league. UWS defines itself as a "pro-am" organization.

USL Super League

The USL Super League is a fully professional second-level women's soccer league which will begin its inaugural season in 2024. In September 2021, the United Soccer League, which operates a system of lower-level leagues for men, women, and youth, announced that it would launch the "USL Super League" for the 2023 season. The Super League's launch has since been put off to 2024. Unlike most other U.S. soccer leagues, the Super League will play a fall-to-spring schedule, in line with the FIFA international calendar and most European leagues.

Women's softball

Women's professional softball has existed in the United States since 1997. Currently the major professional league is Women's Professional Fastpitch.

Women's Professional Fastpitch

Women's Professional Fastpitch (WPF) is the newest league for women's professional softball in the United States and launched its inaugural season in June 2022. The WPF league is unrelated to the defunct league that used the names National Pro Fastpitch (NPF) and Women's Pro Softball League (WPSL) and the initial "Women's Professional Fastpitch" from the 1980s.

Women's roller derby

Women's Flat Track Derby Association

The Women's Flat Track Derby Association (WFTDA) is an association of women's flat track roller derby leagues in the United States. The organization was founded in April 2004 as the United Leagues Coalition (ULC) but was renamed in November 2005.

The WFTDA Championships are the leading competition for roller derby leagues. The Championships are organised by the WFTDA.  They originated in 2006 as the National WFTDA Championship. Full WFTDA members are eligible for ranking in one of the association's four regions.  Each region holds a tournament contested by its top ten leagues: the Eastern, North Central, South Central and Western Regional Tournaments.  The top three leagues from each of these four tournaments qualify for the Championships.  Together, the qualifying tournaments and Championships are termed the "Big 5". Since 2008, the winner of the National Championships has been awarded the Hydra Trophy.

In January 2009, Montreal Roller Derby became the first Canadian league admitted as a member. The league was WFTDA's 66th member, and was placed in the East region. In June 2010, the WFTDA announced the first round of Apprentice league graduates, and formed two new regions ( Canada and Europe) outside of the United States (Leagues in those regions will compete in the closest US region until they develop more fully).

Ringette

National Ringette League

The National Ringette League (NRL) is Canada's premiere league for the sport of ringette in North America but exists exclusively in Canada.  To date, American NRL teams have never been created nor entered the league, though some NRL players have originally come from America and Finland. The league is semi-professional and also acts as a showcase league for the sport of ringette as well as a place for those scouting for ringette talent.

Ringette is a Canadian sport created for girls by Canada's Sam Jacks and Red McCarthy in 1963 in Northern Ontario in the cities of North Bay and Espanola, Ontario. Developed for female players, ringette is a fast-paced team sport on ice in which players use a straight stick to pass, carry, and shoot a rubber ring to score goals. For ten years, play centred in Ontario and Quebec, however the sport quickly spread across Canada and is now played by 50,000 girls internationally. In Canada, ringette is one of the most popular sports played by females and the country regularly records the highest number of annual registrations among all participating nations. 

The creation of the National Ringette League followed the success of the 2002 World Ringette Championships in Edmonton, Alberta, Canada, where Canada won the gold medal and the Sam Jacks Trophy, the premiere trophy for the sport. The first NRL season began in November 2004 with 17 teams. The NRL entered its eighth season in 2011–12 season with 19 teams playing in two conferences across Canada – a Western Conference with 6 teams and an Eastern Conference with 13 teams.

By 2008, the budget of each NRL team oscillated between $15,000 and $20,000. The teams and the league contribute to cover all the transportation spending, accommodation and rent of arenas. The players however have to find their own financiers to pay their equipment and their personal spending and aren't paid to play. The audience for several NRL teams is limited to hundreds of spectators. For a time the NRL benefited from a cover broadcast thanks to a partnership with Webchannel SSN-Canada with the championship final game broadcast on Rogers TV.

In the 2010–11 season, a NRL Championship Tournament replaced the Championship qualifying rounds; this tournament takes place in just one city. This allows the league to create a media event and to hold attention. From March 27 till April 2, 2011, the NRL Championship Tournament took place in Cambridge, Ontario. In the Final, the Edmonton WAM! triumphed over the Cambridge Turbos.

The NRL maintains a collaboration with the lower Ringette leagues in regards the development of the young girls players. Several NRL teams have affiliated development teams with athletes in the Under 19 year (U19) and Under 16 year (U16). The Canadian Ringette Championships for U16 and U19 usually takes place annually in April and also takes place in the same place as the NRL playoff tournament.

Defunct leagues

Women's United Soccer Association

The Women's United Soccer Association, often abbreviated to WUSA was the world's first women's soccer league in which all the players were paid as professionals. Founded in February 2000, the league began its first season in April 2001 with eight teams in the United States. The league suspended operations on September 15, 2003, shortly after the end of its third season.

Women's Professional Soccer (WPS) 

Women's Professional Soccer (WPS) was the top level professional women's soccer league in the United States. It began play on March 29, 2009 and folded in 2012. The league was composed of seven teams for its first two seasons and fielded 6 teams for the 2011 season. The league hoped to have ten teams for the 2012 season, most of the new groups potentially coming from the western half of the country, but ultimately no ownership groups were ready to join in time. The beginning of the league's was marked by two things: low attendance (2009: 4,684, 2010: 3,588  and 2011: 3,518  ), problems with (ex-Freedom) magicJack owner Dan Borislow.

Former WPS commissioner Tonya Antonucci  said that unlike WUSA which had higher expectations and employed a top-down model, WPS would take "a slow and steady growth type of approach", citing WUSA's losses of close to $100 million. She said the new league would have a closer relationship with Major League Soccer, the top men's professional league in the United States, to cut costs on staff and facilities, and for marketing. The team budgets for the inaugural season was $2.5 million.

Fox Soccer Channel and Fox Sports en Español with Samuel Jacobo and Jorge Caamaño will air weekly Sunday night matches & the WPS All-Star Game with Fox Sports Net to air the semifinal and league championship contests. The national television contract will be in effect through the 2011 season with an option for 2012.

On January 30, 2012, the WPS announced suspension of operations for the 2012 season, citing several internal organization struggles as the primary cause. Some of these issues included an ongoing legal battle with magicJack owner Dan Borislow and the lack of resources invested into the league.

There were 14,832 supporters who attended its inaugural match in 2009 at the Home Depot Center (now Dignity Health Sports Park) in Carson, California on  March 29, 2009. Los Angeles Sol 2 - 0 Washington Freedom.

The 2011 WPS Championship game at Sahlen's Stadium (now Marina Auto Stadium) in Rochester saw 10,461 supporters in attendance on August 27, 2011. The game saw the Western New York Flash claim a 1-1 (5-4, PK's) victory over the Philadelphia Independence.

Women's Premier Soccer League Elite

The Women's Premier Soccer League Elite (WPSL Elite) was established in 2012 by the Women's Premier Soccer League (WPSL), responding both to an increased interest in professionalism by existing WPSL teams and the desire of WPS teams for a continuing competitive outlet. The league defined itself as semi-professional, but five of its eight charter teams were to be fully professional. Three of these—the Boston Breakers, Chicago Red Stars, and Western New York Flash—previously played in WPS.

United Soccer League Women's League (USL W-League)

The USL W-League (1995–2015), was a North American women's soccer developmental organization and should not be confused with the existing third-level USL W League which launched in 2022. The former USL W-League was an open league, giving college players the opportunity to play alongside established international players while maintaining their collegiate eligibility. The league was administered by the United Soccer League system, which now oversees the men's USL Championship, USL League One (launched in 2019) and USL League Two (Premier Development League before 2019), as well as the current USL W League and the upcoming USL Super League.

Canadian Women's Hockey League

The Canadian Women's Hockey League (CHWL) was a women's hockey league in Canada for top female hockey players. The CWHL helped women's professional hockey rebound from the demise of the original National Women's Hockey League (NWHL) in 2007. Following the collapse of the Canadian Women's Hockey League (CWHL) in 2019, the Professional Women's Hockey Players Association (PWHPA) was formed. While over 150 players, including most North American ice hockey Olympians, were exclusively affiliated with one of the organisation's regional hubs and a number of games are organized between them, the PWHPA is not organized under a formal league structure.

In the 2017–18 season, the CWHL grew to seven teams: two in the Greater Toronto Area, Les Canadiennes de Montreal, the Calgary Inferno, the Worcester Blades, and the Chinese Kunlun Red Star WIH and Vanke Rays. The Chinese teams served to jump-start that nation's development in women's hockey, as the country is set to host the 2022 Winter Olympics.

The CWHL allowed elite level players to play after college and continue to work toward Olympic and national team success. Prior to the 2017–18 season, the players were not paid and only received incentives. Apart from ice rink time, hotels, transportation (mostly by bus), and some items covered by the league, players paid for all other expenses related to playing at this level (equipment, training, insurance, health services, etc.), and all staff (coaches, general managers, communications workers) served as volunteers. As a result, most players and personnel had jobs outside of hockey. 

In 2010, the Toronto Star reported that the cost of running the league was about $1.7 million. For the 2010–11 season, income was $800,000. Any league profits were then redistributed among the teams as the league was registered as non-profit amateur organization, resulting in insufficient funds to pay players. In 2017, the league began paying the players a stipend up to $10,000 per season, reportedly coming from the increased revenue through the China expansion, while maintaining its amateur registration. The stipends added about $600,000 to the annual expenses.

League attendance is very low in the regular season, but increases during the playoffs. On March 27, 2011, the Championship Final game drew 2,300 fans at Barrie Molson Centre in Barrie, Ontario. Several CWHL matches are broadcast online and TSN broadcasts the Clarkson Cup championship match.

On March 31, 2019, the CWHL announced the league would discontinue operations effective May 1, 2019. The league's expansion and added cost of travel and player stipends had caused operation costs to grow to $4.2 million in the 2017–18 season.

International Women’s Professional Softball Associations
Ladies Professional Golf Association (LPGA) tour member Janie Blaylock, softball legend Joan Joyce, and tennis icon Billie Jean King were the founders of the International Women’s Professional Softball Associations (IWPSA) in 1976. There were ten teams in the league from Meriden, Connecticut, to San Jose, California. During the first season the teams played 120 games in a schedule season. The league ran for four years and was closed due to lack of funds and high travel and facility costs.

Women's Pro Softball League

The Women's Pro Softball League (WPSL) was founded in 1997 and folded in 2001. The league was started by former Utah State University softball player, Jane Cowles and her collegiate coach, John Horan in February 1989. After eight years of research and planning, combined efforts resulted in the launch of the first women's professional softball league in United States history in May of 1997, the "Women's Pro Fastpitch (WPF) league.

In 1986 and 1987 the United States women's national softball team won gold medals in the Pan American Games. Jane Cowles formulated a plan for a women's professional softball league. In February 1989 she showed her parents, John and Sage Cowles, owners of Cowles Media Company the ideas who agreed to help with the financial make up of the league. Eight years later n 1997, the Cowles family and AT&T Wireless Services launched the Women's Pro Fastpitch (WPF) league. After one full year and two seasons of play the league's name was changed to the Women's Professional Softball League (WPSL) which had four teams located in Eastern United States in 2000: the Akron Racers, Florida Wahoos, Ohio Pride and Tampa Bay FireStrix. The Women's Professional Softball League (WPSL) was founded in 1997 and ran until 2001, lasting four seasons before lack of funds, high travel costs and inadequate facilities led to its closure.

In 2001, the "Tour of Fastpitch Champions" enabled the WPSL to expand. From this the league traveled around to eleven different cities to find different candidate for the WPSL teams to play.  They played against All-Star teams and Canada teams; they televised many of them on ESPN2 or ESPN. After all these games they decided to suspend the 2002 season so they could get organized and have more time to find other teams to be able to play. Even though the league was suspended, the WPSL All-Star team competed against the Tennessee All-Star team, as well as put together two clinics. In 2002 the league changed its name again and became National Pro Fastpitch with Major League Baseball partnering with them to continue the MBL's efforts to connect with female athletes.

National Pro Fastpitch

National Pro Fastpitch (NPF), formerly the Women's Pro Softball League (WPSL), was a professional women's softball league in the United States. The teams battled for the Cowles Cup. The (WPSL) was founded in 1997 and folded in 2001; the NPF revived the league in 2004. However, a new softball league began in 2022, the Women's Professional Fastpitch (WPF) league, and the NPF was disbanded. The WPF league is unrelated to the defunct league that used the names National Pro Fastpitch (NPF) and Women's Pro Softball League (WPSL) and the initial "Women's Professional Fastpitch" from the 1980s.

The National Pro Fastpitch league was revived in 2004 and was  an official development partner of Major League Baseball in the women's fastpitch softball. In 2004 a new season began within six markets: Stockton, California; Tucson, Arizona; Houston, Texas; Akron, Ohio; Lowell, Massachusetts; Montclair, New Jersey. Having more teams allowed the league to participate in more games with 178 league-wide games, involving 96 female softball players. In 2006, the Philadelphia Force, the Connecticut Brakettes, the Chicago Bandits, and the New England Riptide joined the league, expanding the season, and competition.

In 2009, after winning a silver medal, several Olympians returned to the NPF: Monica Abbott for Washington, Jennie Finch for Chicago, and Cat Osterman for Rockford. There are now four teams that participate in 50 regular season games: Akron Racers, Chicago Bandits, Florida Pride and Tennessee Diamonds.

The 2011 highlights of the NPF, the USSSA Florida Pride took the Ringer Cup Title with a league record of 30–9, and Colwes Cup was won by the Chicago Bandits. Over 500,000 household viewers watched this game on ESPN2. For the second year in a row the NPF All-Stars performed a tour playing 19 college teams across the United States. The NPF played against the 2009 NCAA Champions the Washington Huskies to a crowd of 3,000 at the home of the Seattle Mariners, in a game which ended in a 1–0 score. This was the first fastpitch game to be held at a Major League Baseball stadium. 2011 also marked the Akron Racers' tenth university.

See also

 Women's sports
 Women's professional sports
 List of professional sports teams in the United States and Canada

Further reading
  M. Ann Hall, Immodest and Sensational: 150 Years of Canadian Women in Sport, James Lorimer & Company Ltd. Toronto 2008. 96 pages. 
 Eileen McDonagh, Laura Pappano, Playing with the boys: why separate is not equal in sports, Oxford University Press, 2008.  349 pages. .
 Rachel Elyachar, Lauren Moag, The Growth of Women’s Sports, December 2002.

References

External links

 The official site of U Sports
 The official site of Canadian Women's Hockey League
 The official site of Women’s National Football Conference (WNFC) League
 
  The official site of NCAA Division I women ice hockey
  The official site of NCAA Division III women ice hockey
 The official site of Ringette Canada
 The official site of National Ringette League
 The official website of Women's National Basketball Association
 The official website of Women's Flat Track Derby Association
 The official site of National Women's Soccer League
 The official site of Women's Premier Soccer League

!
!
!
!